The 2005 Men's South American Volleyball Championship was the 26th edition of the event, organised by South America's governing volleyball body, the Confederación Sudamericana de Voleibol (CSV). It was hosted in Ginasio Jones Minosso in Lages, Brazil from September 14 to September 18, 2005.

Preliminary round robin
Wednesday 2005-09-14

Thursday 2005-09-15

Friday 2005-09-16

Saturday 2005-09-17

Sunday 2005-09-18

Final ranking

Individual awards

References
 Results
 CSV Results

Men's South American Volleyball Championships
S
Volleyball
V
September 2005 sports events in South America